Centrostephanus is a genus of echinoderms belonging to the family Diadematidae.

The genus has almost cosmopolitan distribution.

Species:

Fossils 
 Centrostephanus sacyi

References

Diadematidae
Echinoidea genera